A by-election was held for the Australian House of Representatives seat of Darwin on 30 June 1917. This was triggered by the death of Nationalist MP Charles Howroyd.

The by-election was won by Nationalist candidate William Spence, who had been defeated in his own seat of Darling at the 1917 election.

Results

Charles Howroyd  (Nationalist) died.

References

1917 elections in Australia
Tasmanian federal by-elections
1910s in Tasmania